Dame Joan Alston Sutherland,  (7 November 1926 – 10 October 2010) was an Australian dramatic coloratura soprano known for her contribution to the renaissance of the bel canto repertoire from the late 1950s through to the 1980s.

She possessed a voice combining agility, accurate intonation, pinpoint staccatos, a trill and a strong upper register, although music critics complained about her poor diction.

Sutherland was the first Australian to win a Grammy Award, for the year 1961 Best Classical Performance – Vocal Soloist (with or without orchestra) presented in 1962.

She was known as 'La Stupenda' and is widely regarded as one of the greatest sopranos of all time.

Early and personal life
Joan Sutherland was born in Sydney, Australia, to Scottish parents and attended St Catherine's School in the suburb of Waverley, New South Wales. As a child, she listened to and imitated her mother's singing exercises. Her mother, a mezzo-soprano, had taken voice lessons but never considered making a career as a professional singer. Sutherland was 18 years old when she began seriously studying voice with John and Aida Dickens. She made her concert debut in Sydney, as Dido in a production of Henry Purcell's Dido and Aeneas, in 1947.  After winning Australia's most important competition, the Sun Aria (now known as the Sydney Eisteddfod McDonald's Operatic Aria) in 1949, she came third after the baritone Ronal Jackson in radio 3DB's £1,000 Mobil Quest, which she won a year later. In 1951, she made her stage debut in Eugene Goossens's Judith.  She then went to London to further her studies at the Opera School of the Royal College of Music with Clive Carey. She was engaged by the Royal Opera House, Covent Garden, as a utility soprano, and made her debut there on 28 October 1952, as the First Lady in The Magic Flute, followed in November by a few performances as Clotilde in Vincenzo Bellini's opera Norma, with Maria Callas as Norma.

Being an admirer of Kirsten Flagstad in her early career, she trained to be a Wagnerian dramatic soprano. In December 1952, she sang her first leading role at the Royal Opera House, Amelia in Un ballo in maschera. Other roles included Agathe in Der Freischütz, the Countess in The Marriage of Figaro, Desdemona in Otello, Gilda in Rigoletto, Eva in Die Meistersinger von Nürnberg, and Pamina in The Magic Flute. In 1953, she sang the role of Lady Rich in Benjamin Britten's Gloriana a few months after its world premiere, and created the role of Jenifer in Michael Tippett's The Midsummer Marriage, on 27 January 1955.

Sutherland married Australian conductor and pianist Richard Bonynge on 16 October 1954. Their son, Adam, was born in 1956. Bonynge gradually convinced her that Wagner might not be her Fach, and that since she could produce high notes and coloratura with great ease, she should perhaps explore the bel canto repertoire. She eventually settled in this Fach, spending most of her career singing dramatic coloratura soprano.

Career
In 1957, she appeared in Handel's Alcina with the Handel Opera Society, and sang selections from Donizetti's Emilia di Liverpool in a radio broadcast. The following year she sang Donna Anna in Don Giovanni in Vancouver.

In 1959, Sutherland was invited to sing Lucia di Lammermoor at the Royal Opera House in a production conducted by Tullio Serafin and staged by Franco Zeffirelli. The role of Edgardo was sung by her fellow Australian Kenneth Neate, who had replaced the scheduled tenor at short notice. In 1960, she recorded the album The Art of the Prima Donna: the double LP set won the Grammy Award for Best Classical Performance – Vocal Soloist in 1962. The album was added to the National Film and Sound Archive's Sounds of Australia registry in 2011.

Sutherland sang Lucia to great acclaim in Paris in 1960 and, in 1961, at La Scala and the Metropolitan Opera. For her Met performance of Lucia di Lammermoor, standees began lining up at 7:30 that morning. Her singing of the Mad Scene drew a 12-minute ovation. In 1960 she sang Alcina at La Fenice. Sutherland would soon be praised as La Stupenda in newspapers around the world. Later that year (1960), Sutherland sang Alcina at the Dallas Opera, with which she made her US debut.

Her Metropolitan Opera debut took place on 26 November 1961, when she sang Lucia. After a total of 223 performances in a number of different operas, her last appearance there was a concert on 12 March 1989. During the 1978–82 period her relationship with the Met deteriorated when Sutherland had to decline the role of Constanze in Mozart's Die Entführung aus dem Serail, more than a year before the rehearsals were scheduled to start. The opera house management then declined to stage the operetta The Merry Widow especially for her, as requested; subsequently, she did not perform at the Met during that time at all, even though a production of Rossini's Semiramide had also been planned, but later she returned there to sing in other operas.

During the 1960s, Sutherland added the heroines of bel canto to her repertoire: Violetta in Verdi's La traviata, Amina in Bellini's La sonnambula and Elvira in Bellini's I puritani in 1960; the title role in Bellini's Beatrice di Tenda in 1961; Marguerite de Valois in Meyerbeer's Les Huguenots and the title role in Rossini's Semiramide in 1962; Norma in Bellini's Norma and Cleopatra in Handel's Giulio Cesare in 1963. In 1966 she added Marie in Donizetti's La fille du régiment.

In 1965, Sutherland toured Australia with the Sutherland-Williamson Opera Company. Accompanying her was a young tenor named Luciano Pavarotti.

During the 1970s, Sutherland strove to improve her diction, which had often been criticised, and increase the expressiveness of her interpretations. She continued to add dramatic bel canto roles to her repertoire, such as Donizetti's Maria Stuarda and Lucrezia Borgia, as well as Massenet's Esclarmonde. With Pavarotti she made a studio-recording of Turandot in 1972 under the baton of Zubin Mehta, though she never performed the role on stage.

Sutherland's early recordings show her to be possessed of a crystal-clear voice and excellent diction. However, by the early 1960s her voice lost some of this clarity in the middle register, and she often came under fire for having unclear diction. Some have attributed this to sinus surgery; however, her major sinus surgery was done in 1959, immediately after her breakthrough Lucia at Covent Garden. In fact, her first commercial recording of the first and final scene of Lucia reveals her voice and diction to be just as clear as prior to the sinus procedure. Her husband Richard Bonynge stated in an interview that her "mushy diction" occurred while striving to achieve perfect legato. According to him, it is because she earlier had a very Germanic "un-legato" way of singing.

During the 1980s, Sutherland added Anna Bolena, Amalia in I masnadieri, and Adriana Lecouvreur to her repertoire, and repeated Esclarmonde at the Royal Opera House performances in November and December 1983. Her last full-length dramatic performance was as Marguerite de Valois (Les Huguenots) at the Sydney Opera House in 1990, at the age of 63, where she sang Home Sweet Home for her encore. Her last public appearance, however, took place in a gala performance of Die Fledermaus on New Year's Eve, 1990, at Covent Garden, where she was accompanied by her colleagues Luciano Pavarotti and the mezzo-soprano Marilyn Horne. According to her own words, given in an interview with The Guardian newspaper in 2002, her biggest achievement was to sing the title role in Esclarmonde. She considered those performances and recordings her best.

Retirement years

After retirement, Sutherland made relatively few public appearances, preferring a quiet life at her home in Les Avants, Switzerland. One exception was her 1994 address at a lunch organised by Australians for Constitutional Monarchy, when Sutherland commented: "It also upsets me that it is such a damned job to get an Australian passport now – you have to go to be interviewed by a Chinese or an Indian. I'm not particularly racist, but I find it ludicrous." Her criticism caused controversy.

On 3 July 2008, she fell and broke both legs while gardening at her home in Switzerland.

Film role
Sutherland had a leading role as Mother Rudd in the 1995 comedy film Dad and Dave: On Our Selection opposite Leo McKern and Geoffrey Rush.

Publications
In 1997, she published an autobiography, A Prima Donna's Progress. It received mixed reviews for its literary merits. Library Journal stated,
Opera superstar Dame Joan Sutherland gives an exhaustive account of her performing and recording career over four decades. From her early years in Australia and with the Covent Garden company in London, to her daunting schedule at most of the major opera houses of the world, we read endlessly of where, when, and with whom she sang which roles. We're shown a sensible woman and a hard-working artist, with a healthy ego tempered by a sense of humor that is often self-deprecating.
The work includes a complete list of all her performances, with full cast lists.

Her official biography, Joan Sutherland: The Authorised Biography, published in February 1994, was written by Norma Major, wife of the then prime minister John Major.

In 2002, she appeared at a dinner in London to accept the Royal Philharmonic Society's gold medal. She gave an interview to The Guardian in which she lamented the lack of technique in young opera singers and the dearth of good teachers. By this time she was no longer giving master classes herself; when asked by Italian journalists in May 2007 why this was, she replied: "Because I'm 80 years old and I really don't want to have anything to do with opera any more, although I do sit on the juries of singing competitions." The Cardiff Singer of the World competition was the one that Sutherland was most closely associated with after her retirement. She began her regular involvement with the event in 1993, serving on the jury five consecutive times and later, in 2003, becoming its patron.

Death
On 11 October 2010, Sutherland's family announced that she had died at her home at Les Avants in Switzerland the previous day of cardiopulmonary failure – "the heart just gave out...When it came to the point that she physically couldn't do anything, she didn't want to live any more. She wanted to go, she was happy to go, and in the end she died very, very peacefully." Though she recovered from her fall in 2008, it led to more serious health problems. A statement from her family said "She's had a long life and gave a lot of pleasure to a lot of people." Sutherland had requested a small, private funeral service. Her funeral was held on 14 October and Opera Australia planned a tribute to her. Artistic director of Opera Australia, Lyndon Terracini, said "We won't see her like again. She had a phenomenal range, size and quality of voice. We simply don't hear that any more." Sutherland is survived by her husband, son, daughter-in-law and two grandchildren.

Australian Prime Minister Julia Gillard said, "She was of course one of the great opera voices of the 20th century," adding that Dame Joan showed a lot of "quintessential Australian values. She was described as down to earth despite her status as a diva. On behalf of all Australians I would like to extend my condolences to her husband Richard and son Adam and their extended family at this difficult time. I know many Australians will be reflecting on her life's work today."

Memorial service
A State Memorial Service on 9 November 2010, arranged by Opera Australia, was held at the Sydney Opera House. Speakers at the service were Julia Gillard, Prime Minister of Australia; Professor Marie Bashir, the Governor of New South Wales; Moffatt Oxenbould, the former Artistic Director of Opera Australia; and Sutherland's son, Adam Bonynge. The service was broadcast live by both ABC1 television and ABC Classic FM (radio) and streamed globally by ABC News 24. Further memorial services were held in Westminster Abbey on 15 February 2011, and in New York City on 24 May 2011, which was hosted by Marilyn Horne with an appearance by Richard Bonynge. In attendance were Sherrill Milnes, Norman Ayrton, Regina Resnik, and Spiro Malas.

Voice

Vocal timbre

Described as "fresh," "silvery" and "bell-like" until 1963, Joan Sutherland's voice later became "golden" and "warm"; music critic John Yohalem writes it was like "molten honey caressing the line." In his book Voices, Singers and Critics, John Steane writes that "if the tonal spectrum ranges from bright to dark, Sutherland's place would be near the centre, which is no doubt another reason for her wide appeal." According to John Yohalem, "Her lower register was a cello register, Stradivarius-hued." Her voice was full and rounded even in her highest notes, which were brilliant, but sometimes "slightly acid."

In 1971, Time writes an article comparing Sutherland and Beverly Sills,
Originally bright and youthful-sounding, her voice darkened as she transformed herself into a coloratura. There is a suggestion of Callas' famous middle register in Sutherland's vocal center—a tone that sounds as if the singer were singing into the neck of a resonant bottle. Today the Sutherland voice towers like a natural wonder, unique as Niagara or Mount Everest. Sills' voice is made of more ordinary stuff; what she shares with Callas is an abandon in hurling herself into fiery emotional music and a willingness to sacrifice vocal beauty for dramatic effect. Sutherland deals in vocal velvet, Sills in emotional dynamite. Sutherland's voice is much larger, but its plush monochrome robs it of carrying power in dramatic moments. Sills' multicolored voice, though smaller, projects better and has a cutting edge that can slice through the largest orchestra and chorus. Sometimes, indeed, it verges on shrillness. [...] In slow, legato music, Sills has a superior sense of rhythm and clean attack to keep things moving; Sutherland's more flaccid beat and her style of gliding from note to note often turn song into somnolence. Sills' diction in English, French and Italian is superb; Sutherland's vocal placement produces mushy diction in any language, but makes possible an even more seamless beauty of tone than is available to Sills.

Describing Sutherland's voice, John Yohalem writes:
On my personal color scale, which runs from a voluptuous red (Tebaldi) or blood-orange (Price) or purple (Caballé) or red-purple (Troyanos) to white-hot (Rysanek) or runny yellow-green (Sills), Sutherland is among the "blue" sopranos – which has nothing to do with "blues" in the pop sense of the term. (Ella Fitzgerald had a blue voice, but Billie Holiday had a blues voice, which is very different.) Diana Damrau is blue. Mirella Freni is blue-ish. Karita Mattila is ice blue. Régine Crespin was deep blue shading to violet. Sutherland was true blue (like the Garter ribbon). There is a coolness here that can take on the passion in the music but does not inject passion where the music lacks it, could possibly use it.

Vocal category, size and range

Although she is generally described as a dramatic coloratura soprano, "categorizing Sutherland's voice has always been extremely difficult, both the size and the sound present definitional problems [...] Aside from singing some roles popular among coloratura sopranos, Sutherland's voice could not be more different."

In a 1961 profile in The New York Times Magazine, Sutherland said she initially had "a big rather wild voice" that was not heavy enough for Wagner, although she did not realise this until she heard "Wagner sung as it should be."

Regarding the size of Sutherland's voice, Opera Britannia praise "a voice of truly heroic dimensions singing bel canto. It is doubtful if any soprano in this repertoire has fielded quite so much power and tone as Dame Joan, and this includes Callas and Tetrazzini. The contrast with other sopranos who sing the same roles is appropriately enough stupendous, with rival prima donnas producing small pin points of sound as compared to Sutherland's seemingly endless cascades of full tone." In 1972, music critic Winthrop Sargeant describes her voice "as large as that of a top-ranking Wagnerian soprano" in The New Yorker.

Sutherland's vocal range extended from G below the staff (G3) to high F (F6), or high F-sharp (F6), although she never sang this last note in a public performance.

Honours
During her career and after, Sutherland received many honours and awards. She was made a Commander of the Order of the British Empire (CBE) in the 1961 Birthday Honours. That year she was named the Australian of the Year. Sutherland is a Distinguished Member of the Sigma Alpha Iota International Music Fraternity.

In the 1975 Queen's Birthday Honours, she was in the first group of people to be named Companions of the Order of Australia (AC) (the order had been created only in February 1975). She was elevated within the Order of the British Empire from Commander to Dame Commander (DBE) in the 1979 New Year Honours.

On 29 November 1991, the Queen bestowed on Sutherland the Order of Merit (OM).

Awards
In 1992 Sutherland was a founding patron and active supporter of the Tait Memorial Trust in London. A charity established by Isla Baring OAM, the daughter of Sir Frank Tait of J. C. Williamson's to support young Australian performing artists in the UK. Sir Frank Tait was the Australian impresario who created and managed the Sutherland-Williamson tour of Australia in 1965.

Sutherland House and the Dame Joan Sutherland Centre, both at St Catherine's School, Waverley, and the Joan Sutherland Performing Arts Centre (JSPAC), Penrith, are all named in her honour.

John Paul College, a leading private school in Queensland, Australia, dedicated its newly established facility the Dame Joan Sutherland Music Centre in 1991. Sutherland visited the centre for its opening and again in 1996.

She received the Lifetime Contribution Award in 2001 Echo Klassik.
In January 2004 she received the Australia Post Australian Legends Award which honours Australians who have contributed to the Australian identity and culture. Two stamps featuring Joan Sutherland were issued on Australia Day 2004 to mark the award. Later in 2004, she received a Kennedy Center Honor for her outstanding achievement throughout her career.

On 22 May 2007, the year of the centenary of the birth of soprano Lina Pagliughi, she received the award La Siòla d'Oro at the Teatro Comunale di Bologna.

In 2012, Sutherland was voted into the first Hall of Fame of the magazine Gramophone.

Roles
Sutherland performed live the following complete roles.

Recordings
Recitals

Sutherland made various recital and lieder recordings, usually with Richard Bonynge, many of them originally double-LPs. Some are still available in CD-format.

In 2011 Decca re-released these recitals in a 23-CD set (Complete Decca Studio Recitals, Decca 4783243) comprising:
 Operatic Arias (1959)
 The Art of the Prima Donna (1960) 2CD
 Command Performance (1962) 2CD
 The Age of Bel Canto (with Marilyn Horne and Richard Conrad, 1963) 2CD
 Joy to the World (Christmas Album, 1965)
 The Noël Coward Album (1966)
 Love Live Forever (1966) 2CD
 Romantic French Arias (1969) 2CD
 Songs My Mother Taught Me (1972)
 Operatic Duets (with Luciano Pavarotti, 1976)
 Serate Musicali (1978) 2CD
 Sutherland sings Wagner (1978)
 Sutherland sings Mozart (1979)
 Bel Canto Arias (1985)
 Talking Pictures (1986)
 Romantic Trios, Songs for soprano, horn and piano (1987)
 Rarities and first recordings (1958/59 to 1967/68)

Opera recordings (non-exhaustive)

Vincenzo Bellini
 Beatrice di Tenda—Joan Sutherland (Beatrice), Luciano Pavarotti (Orombello), Cornelius Opthof (Filippo), Josephine Veasey (Agnese), Joseph Ward (Anichino/Rizzardo), Ambrosian Opera Chorus, London Symphony Orchestra, Richard Bonynge, recorded 1966 Decca
 I puritani—Joan Sutherland (Elvira), Pierre Duval (Arturo), Renato Capecchi (Riccardo), Ezio Flagello (Giorgio), Giovanni Fioiani (Gualtiero), Margreta Elkins (Enrichetta), Piero de Palma (Bruno), Coro e Orchestra del Maggio Musicale Fiorentino, Richard Bonynge (conductor) –recorded 1963– Decca 448 969-2 / Decca 467 789-2 (part of a 10-CD set) / London POCL 3965-7
 I puritani—Joan Sutherland (Elvira), Luciano Pavarotti (Arturo), Piero Cappuccilli (Riccardo), Nicolai Ghiaurov (Giorgio), Giancarlo Luccardi (Gualtiero), Anita Caminada (Enrichetta), Renato Cazzaniga (Bruno), Chorus of the Royal Opera, Covent Garden, London Symphony Orchestra—Richard Bonynge, recorded 1973, Decca
 La sonnambula—Joan Sutherland (Amina), Nicola Monti (Elvino), Fernando Corena (Rodolfo), Sylvia Stahlman (Lisa), Margreta Elkins (Teresa), Angelo Mercuriali (Notary), Giovanni Fioiani (Alessio), Coro e Orchestra del Maggio Musicale Fiorentino, Richard Bonynge recorded 1962—Decca 00289 448 9662 6 / 000320702 / 455 823-2—Track listing
 La sonnambula—Joan Sutherland (Amina), Luciano Pavarotti (Elvino), Nicolai Ghiaurov (Rodolfo), Isobel Buchanan (Lisa), Della Jones (Teresa), Piero De Palma (Notaro), John Tomlinson (Alessio), National Philharmonic Orchestra, London Opera Chorus, Richard Bonynge, recorded 1980—Decca 2LH417-424
 Norma—Joan Sutherland (Norma), Marilyn Horne (Adalgisa), John Alexander (Pollione), Richard Cross (Oroveso), Yvonne Minton (Clotilde), Joseph Ward (Flavio), London Symphony Orchestra and Chorus, Richard Bonynge, recorded 1964—Decca
 Norma—Joan Sutherland (Norma), Margreta Elkins (Adalgisa), Ronald Stevens (Pollione), Clifford Grant (Oroveso), Etela Piha (Clotilde), Trevor Brown (Flavio), Opera Australia Chorus, Elizabethan Sydney Orchestra, Richard Bonynge, recorded 1978—DVD Arthaus Musik 100 180
 Norma—Joan Sutherland (Norma), Montserrat Caballé (Adalgisa), Luciano Pavarotti (Pollione), Samuel Ramey (Oroveso), Diana Montague (Clotilde), Kim Begley (Flavio), Chorus and Orchestra of the Welsh National Opera, Richard Bonynge, recorded 1984—Decca

Georges Bizet
 Carmen—Regina Resnik (Carmen), Mario Del Monaco (Don Jose), Joan Sutherland (Micaëla), Tom Krause (Escamillo), Georgette Spanellys (Frasquita), Yvonne Minton (Mercedes), Robert Geay (Zuniga), Jean Prudent (Le Dancaire), Alfred Hallet (Le Remendado), Claude Cales (Morales). Orchestre de la Suisse Romande, recorded 1963

Giovanni Bononcini
 Griselda (highlights) —Joan Sutherland (Griselda), Lauris Elms (Ernesto), Monica Sinclair (Gualtiero), Margreta Elkins (Almirena), Spiro Malas (Rambaldo), Ambrosian Opera Chorus, London Philharmonic Orchestra, Richard Bonynge, recorded 1966. Decca 448 977-2 (coupled with Montezuma)

Francesco Cilea
 Adriana Lecouvreur—Joan Sutherland (Adriana Lecouvreur), Carlo Bergonzi (Maurizio),  (Il Principe di Bouillon), Cleopatra Ciurca (La Principessa di Bouillon), Leo Nucci (Michonnet), Chorus and Orchestra of the Welsh National Opera, Richard Bonynge, recorded 1988, Decca.

Léo Delibes
 Lakmé—Joan Sutherland (Lakmé), Gabriel Bacquier (Nilakantha), Jane Berbié (Malika), Émile Belcourt (Hadji), Alain Vanzo (Gérald), Monte Carlo Opera Chorus, Orchestre National de l'Opéra de Monte-Carlo, Richard Bonynge, recorded 1967, Decca Records.

Gaetano Donizetti
 Emilia di Liverpool (excerpts) / Lucia di Lammermoor (excerpts)—Joan Sutherland (Lucia), Margreta Elkins (Alisa), Joao Gibin (Edgardo), Tullio Serafin (conductor). Recorded 26 February 1959—Myto Records MCD 91545 (Probably these are excerpts from the same performance as the Melodram recording.)
 Lucia di Lammermoor—Joan Sutherland (Lucia), Renato Cioni (Edgardo), Robert Merrill (Enrico), Cesare Siepi (Raimondo), Chorus & Orchestra of the Accademia di Santa Cecilia, John Pritchard (conductor), Decca, 1961.
 Lucia di Lammermoor—Joan Sutherland (Lucia), Luciano Pavarotti (Edgardo), Sherrill Milnes(Enrico), Nicolai Ghiaurov (Raimondo), Chorus & Orchestra of the Royal Opera House, Covent Garden, Richard Bonynge, Decca, 1971.
 Lucia di Lammermoor—Joan Sutherland (Lucia), João Gibin (Edgardo), John Shaw (Enrico), Joseph Rouleau (Raimondo), Kenneth MacDonald (Arturo), Margreta Elkins (Alisa), Robert Bowman (Normanno), Chorus & Orchestra of the Royal Opera House, Covent Garden, Tullio Serafin, recorded 1959—Golden Melodram GM 50024 or Giuseppe di Stefano GDS 21017 or Bella Voce BLV 107 218 (highlights). 2006 release: Royal Opera House Heritage Series ROHS 002.
 Lucia di Lammermoor—Joan Sutherland (Lucia), André Turp (Edgardo), John Shaw (Enrico), Joseph Rouleau (Raimondo), Kenneth MacDonald (Arturo), Margreta Elkins (Alisa), Edgar Evans (Normanno), Chorus & Orchestra of the Royal Opera House, Covent Garden, John Pritchard, recorded 1961—Celestial Audio CA 345
 Lucia di Lammermoor—Joan Sutherland (Lucia), Richard Tucker (Edgardo), Frank Guarrera (Enrico), Nicola Moscona (Raimondo), Robert Nagy (Normanno), Thelma Votipka (Alisa), Charles Anthony (Arturo), Metropolitan Opera House, Conductor: Silvio Varviso. Recorded 9 December 1961 for radio broadcasting.
 La fille du régiment—Joan Sutherland (Marie), Luciano Pavarotti (Tonio), Monica Sinclair (La Marquise de Berkenfield), Jules Bruyère (Hortensius), Spiro Malas (Sulpice), Eric Garrett (Le Caporal), Edith Coates (La Duchesse de Crakentorp), Orchestra & Chorus of the Royal Opera House, Covent Garden, Richard Bonynge. Recorded: Kingsway Hall, London, 17–28 July 1967. Original LP release: SET 372-3 (two LPs), CD release: 414 520-2 DH2 (two CDs).
 L'elisir d'amore—Joan Sutherland (Adina), Luciano Pavarotti (Nemorino), Dominic Cossa (Belcore), Spiro Malas (Dulcamara),  (Giannetta), Ambrosian Opera Chorus, English Chamber Orchestra, Richard Bonynge. Recorded: Kingsway Hall, London, 12–23 January and 1–10 July 1970. Original LP release: SET 503-5 (three LPs), CD release: 414 461-2 DH2 (two CDs), CD re-release: 475 7514 DOR2 (two CDs).
 Lucrezia Borgia—Joan Sutherland (Lucrezia Borgia), Ronald Stevens (Gennaro), Margreta Elkins (Maffio Orsini), Richard Allman (Don Alfonso), Robin Donald (Jacopo Liveretto), Lyndon Terracini (Don Apostolo Gazella), Gregory Yurisich (Ascanio Petrucci), Lamberto Furlan (Oloferno Vitellozzo), Pieter Van der Stolk (Gubetta), Graeme Ewer (Rustighello), John Germain (Astolfo), Neville Grave (Un servo), Eddie Wilden (Un coppiere), Jennifer Bermingham (Principessa Negroni), Australian Opera Chorus, Sydney Elizabethan Orchestra, Richard Bonynge, recorded 1977. VHS Video Cassette—Castle Video CV2845 (PAL); Polygram-Vidéo 070 031-3 (SECAM) Polygram 079 261-3 (PAL)
 Lucrezia Borgia—Joan Sutherland (Lucrezia), Giacomo Aragall (Gennaro), Marilyn Horne (Orsini), Ingvar Wixell (Alfonso), London Opera Chorus, National Philharmonic Orchestra, Richard Bonynge (conductor), Decca, 1977.
 Maria Stuarda—Joan Sutherland (Maria), Huguette Tourangeau (Elisabeta), Luciano Pavarotti (Leicester), Roger Soyer (Talbot), Margreta Elkins (Anna), James Morris (Cecil), Coro del Teatro Comunale di Bologna, Orchestra del Teatro Comunale di Bologna, Richard Bonynge, recorded 1975—Decca 00289 425 4102 / Lyrica LRC 1040/1041—Track listing and excerpts

Charles Gounod
 Faust—Joan Sutherland (Marguerite), Franco Corelli (Faust), Nicolai Ghiaurov (Méphistophélès), Robert Massard (Valentin), Margreta Elkins (Siébel), Monica Sinclair (Marthe), Raymond Myers (Wagner), Ambrosian Opera Chorus and Highgate School Choir, London Symphony Orchestra, Richard Bonynge, Decca 0289 4705632 4 (2002 release) / 421 240-2 (1991 release) / 467 059-2 / London POCL 3962-4 Track listing and audio samples

George Frideric Handel
 Acis and Galatea—Joan Sutherland (Galatea), Peter Pears (Acis), Owen Brannigan (Polyphemus), David Galliver (Damon), The St. Anthony Singers, Philomusica of London, Sir Adrian Boult (Conductor).  L'Oiseau-Lyre OL 50179-80
 Alcina—Joan Sutherland (Alcina), Margreta Elkins (Ruggiero), Lauris Elms (Bradamante), Richard Greager (Oronte), Narelle Davidson (Morgana), Ann-Maree McDonald (Oberto), John Wegner (Melisso), Chorus and Orchestra of Australian Opera, Richard Bonynge, recorded 1983. Celestial Audio CA 112
 Alcina coupled with Giulio Cesare in Egitto (highlights)—Margreta Elkins (Giulio Cesare), Joan Sutherland (Cleopatra), Marilyn Horne (Cornelia), Monica Sinclair (Tolomeo), Richard Conrad (Sesto), New Symphonic Orchestra of London, Richard Bonynge—Decca 00289 433 7232 / 467063-2 / 467 067-2—Track listing and excerpts
 Athalia—Joan Sutherland, Emma Kirkby, Aled Jones, James Bowman, Anthony Rolfe Johnson, David Thomas, The Academy of Ancient Music, Christopher Hogwood (Conductor)
 Messiah—Joan Sutherland, Grace Bumbry, Kenneth McKellar, David Ward, London Symphony Orchestra, Sir Adrian Boult (Conductor)—Decca 433 003-2
 Rodelinda—Alfred Hallett (Grimoaldo), Raimund Herincx (Garibaldo), Joan Sutherland (Rodelinda), Dame Janet Baker (Eduige), Margreta Elkins (Bertarido), Patricia Kern (Unolfo), Chandos Singers, Philomusica Antiqua Orchestra, Charles Farncombe. An English language version, recorded live on 24 June 1959—Opera D'oro OPD 1189 (two CDs) or Memories HR 4577–4578 or Living Stage LS 403 35147 (highlights).
 Rodelinda—Joan Sutherland (Rodelinda), Huguette Tourangeau (Bertarido), Éric Tappy (Grimoaldo), Margreta Elkins (Eduige), Cora Canne-Meijer (Unolfo), Pieter Van Den Berg (Garibaldo), Netherlands Chamber Orchestra, Richard Bonynge. Recorded 30 June 1973—Bella Voce BLV 10 7206.

Jules Massenet
 Esclarmonde—Joan Sutherland (Esclarmonde), Huguette Tourangeau (Parséis), Clifford Grant (Phorcas), Giacomo Aragall (Roland), Louis Quilico (the bishop of Blois), Ryland Davies (Enéas), Robert Lloyd (Cléomer), Finchley Children's Music Group, John Alldis Choir, National Philharmonic Orchestra, Richard Bonynge, Decca 3 CDs 475 7914 DM3 (2006 release)

Giacomo Meyerbeer
 Les Huguenots—Joan Sutherland (Marguerite), Franco Corelli (Raoul), Giulietta Simionato (Valentine), Nicolai Ghiaurov (Marcel), Fiorenza Cossotto (Urbain), Gianandrea Gavazzeni, Orchestra e Coro del Teatro Alla Scala. Live: 7 June 1962. Opera D'Oro. Sung in Italian.
 Les Huguenots—Dominic Cossa (Nevers), Gabriel Bacquier (Saint-Bris), Nicola Ghiuselev (Marcel), John Wakefield (Tavannes), Joseph Ward (Cossé), John Noble (Thoré), Glynne Thomas (Retz), John Gibbs (Meru), Clifford Grant (Maurevert), Janet Coster (Léonard), Dame Kiri Te Kanawa (1st Maid of Honour), Josephte Clement (2nd Maid of Honour), Arleen Auger (1st Gypsy Girl), Maureen Lehane (2nd Gypsy Girl), Joan Sutherland (Marguerite de Valois), Martina Arroyo (Valentine), Huguette Tourangeau (Urbain), Anastasios Vrenios (Raoul de Nangis), Alan Opie (2nd Monk), NPO, Bonynge. Decca 430 549-2, recorded in 1969.

Wolfgang Amadeus Mozart
 Idomeneo—Sergei Baigildin (Idomeneo), Margreta Elkins (Idamante), Henri Wilden (Arbace), Leona Mitchell (Ilia), Joan Sutherland (Elettra), Australian Opera Chorus, Sydney Elizabethan Orchestra, Richard Bonynge, recorded 1979. Gala GLH 826 (highlights) and Celestial Audio CA 060 (highlights)
 Don Giovanni—Gottlob Frick (Commendatore), Luigi Alva (Don Ottavio), Graziella Sciutti (Zerlina), Joan Sutherland (Donna Anna), Piero Cappuccilli (Masetto), Elisabeth Schwarzkopf (Donna Elvira), Eberhard Wächter (Don Giovanni), Heinrich Schmidt, Giuseppe Taddei (Leporello), London Philharmonia Orchestra, Carlo Maria Giulini. Recorded 1959—EMI 0724356787353
 Don Giovanni—Gabriel Bacquier (Don Giovanni), Pilar Lorengar (Donna Elvira), Marilyn Horne (Zerlina), Joan Sutherland (Donna Anna), English Chamber Orchestra, Richard Bonynge. Decca 448 973-2

Jacques Offenbach
 Les contes d'Hoffmann—Joan Sutherland, Plácido Domingo, Gabriel Bacquier, L'Orchestre de la Suisse Romande, Orchestre du Radio de la Suisse Romande, Pro Arte de Lausanne, Andre Charlet, Richard Bonynge, studio recording made at Victoria Hall, Geneva, first published in 1976.

Giacomo Puccini
 Suor Angelica—Joan Sutherland (Angelica), Christa Ludwig (La Zia Principessa), National Philharmonic Orchestra, Richard Bonynge. Decca 475 6531 (coupled with Leoni's "L'oracolo")
 Turandot—Joan Sutherland (Turandot), Luciano Pavarotti (Calaf), Montserrat Caballé (Liu), Nicolai Ghiaurov (Timur), Peter Pears (Emperor), London Philharmonic Orchestra, Zubin Mehta. Decca 414 274-2, recorded in 1972.

Gioachino Rossini
 Semiramide—Joan Sutherland (Semiramide), John Serge (Idreno), Joseph Rouleau (Assur), Spiro Malas (Oroe), Patricia Clark (Azema), Leslie Fyson (Mitrane), Michael Langdon (Spectre of Nino), Marilyn Horne (Arsace), London Symphony Orchestra, Richard Bonynge. Decca 425 481-2, recorded in 1966.

Ambroise Thomas
 Hamlet—Joan Sutherland, Gösta Winbergh, James Morris, Sherill Milnes, Orchestra and Chorus of the Welsh National Opera. Decca, 433 857-2, recorded in April 1983.

Giuseppe Verdi
 Ernani—Luciano Pavarotti (Ernani), Joan Sutherland (Elvira), Leo Nucci (Carlo), Paata Burchuladze (Silva), Linda McLeod (Giovanna), Richard Morton (Riccardo), Alastair Miles (Jago), Orchestra and Chorus of Welsh National Opera, Richard Bonynge. Recorded: Walthamstow Assembly Hall, 10–21 May 1987. Original CD release: 421 412-2 DHO2 (two CDs), CD re-release: 475 7008 DM2 (two CDs)
 I masnadieri—Joan Sutherland, Samuel Ramey, Franco Bonisolli, Matteo Manuguerra, Simone Alaimo, Orchestra and Chorus of the Welsh Nation, Richard Bonynge. CD re-release in 1993: 433 854–2 (two CD, DDD).
 Requiem—Joan Sutherland, Marilyn Horne, Luciano Pavarotti, Martti Talvela, Vienna State Opera Chorus and Vienna Philharmonic, sir Sir Georg Solti (1967), Decca 411 944-2
 Requiem—Joan Sutherland, Fiorenza Cossotto, Luigi Ottolini, Ivo Vinco, Philharmonia Orchestra and Chorus, Carlo Maria Giulini (1960 live recording), Myto 00309
 Rigoletto—Cornell MacNeil, Joan Sutherland, Renato Cioni, Cesare Siepi, Chorus & Orchestra of the Accademia di Santa Cecilia, Nino Sanzogno, Decca, 1961.
 Rigoletto—Sherrill Milnes, Joan Sutherland, Luciano Pavarotti, Martti Talvela, Ambrosian Opera Chorus, London Symphony Orchestra, Richard Bonynge, Decca, 1971.
 La traviata—Joan Sutherland, Carlo Bergonzi, Robert Merrill, Chorus & Orchestra of Maggio Musicale Fiorentino, John Pritchard, Decca, 1962
 La traviata—Joan Sutherland, Luciano Pavarotti, Matteo Manuguerra, National Philharmonic Orchestra, Richard Bonynge. London 430 491-2 recorded in 1979.
 Il trovatore—Luciano Pavarotti (Manrico), Ingvar Wixell (Il Conte di Luna), Nicolai Ghiaurov (Ferrando), Joan Sutherland (Leonora), Marilyn Horne (Azucena), Graham Clark (Ruiz), Norma Burrowes (Ines), Peter Knapp (Un vecchio zingaro), Wynford Evans (Un messo), London Opera Chorus, National Philharmonic Orchestra, Richard Bonynge. Recorded: Kingsway Hall, London, 8, 10, 11, 13–18, 20 September 1976; 26 March 1977. Original LP release: D82D 3 (three LPs), CD release: 417 137-2 DH2* (two CDs), CD re-release: 460 735-2 DF2 (two CDs). (Ballet music not included in CD release).

Richard Wagner
 Siegfried—Joan Sutherland as the Woodbird, Vienna Philharmonic (Sir Georg Solti) 1962 recording, London 414 110-2

Video recordings
 The Metropolitan Opera Centennial Gala, Deutsche Grammophon DVD, 00440-073-4358, 2009

References

Further reading 
 
 
 Norma Major: Joan Sutherland: The Authorized Biography, Queen Anne Press, 1987,  / Little, Brown and Company, 1994, 
 Joan Sutherland: A Prima Donna's Progress – The Autobiography of Joan Sutherland, Weidenfeld & Nicolson, 1997,

External links

 Joan Sutherland at Decca Records
 
 Dame Joan Sutherland programs in the National Library of Australia
 Recordings and other material, Internet Archive
 "Sutherland, Joan", National Library of Australia record

Interviews
 Interview with Dame Joan Sutherland Arts and Culture: Christopher Purdy, 2 November 2006
 Joan Sutherland interview by Bruce Duffie

Obituaries
 Dame Joan Sutherland obituary, John Amis, Alan Blyth, The Guardian, 11 October 2010
 Joan Sutherland: addio, Stupenda, Anne Midgette at The Washington Post
 "Dame Joan Sutherland remembered" by Paul Westcott, Opera Now (London), 14 October 2010

1926 births
2010 deaths
20th-century Australian women opera singers
Alumni of the Royal College of Music
ARIA Award winners
ARIA Hall of Fame inductees
Australian Dames Commander of the Order of the British Empire
Australian expatriates in Switzerland
Australian members of the Order of Merit
Australian monarchists
Australian operatic sopranos
Australian people of Scottish descent
Australian of the Year Award winners
Companions of the Order of Australia
Decca Records artists
Grammy Award winners
Helpmann Award winners
Honorary Members of the Royal Academy of Music
Kennedy Center honorees
London Records artists
Royal Philharmonic Society Gold Medallists
Sigma Alpha Iota
Singers awarded knighthoods
Singers from Sydney